"Does It Make You Remember" is a 1982 single release from Kim Carnes's album Voyeur. 
It was the follow up single to Kim's controversial "Voyeur" and featured an accompanying MTV music video.  She performed both hits on an episode of Solid Gold.

The single reached #36 on the Billboard Hot 100 and #38 in Cash Box magazine in early 1983.

Format and track listings
7" Single
A   "Does It Make You Remember" (5:10)
B   "Take It on the Chin" (4:30)

Chart performance

References 

1982 singles
Kim Carnes songs
Songs written by Kim Carnes
EMI America Records singles
1982 songs